"Buy My Own Drinks" is a song recorded by American country music group Runaway June. It was released as a single in August 2018, and served as the second single from their self-titled EP and lead-off single to Blue Roses, their full-length debut album, both released via Wheelhouse.

Content
"Buy My Own Drinks" is an uptempo "ebullient female anthem" about a woman who goes out for drinks following the end of a relationship and celebrates how she doesn't need a man. It was written by all three members of Runaway June along with Josh Kear and Hillary Lindsey.

Music video
The music video for the song premiered on March 1, 2019. Directed by Peter Zavadil, it features the 3 members of the group as bartenders at a local bar, as well as younger versions of themselves reenacting each member's dreams if they weren't a singer: an artist, a dog groomer, and a bouncer.

Chart performance
"Buy My Own Drinks" debuted on the Billboard Country Airplay chart at number 59 on the chart dated October 6, 2018. It reached the top 10 of the chart in September 2019, making it the first time a female group or trio had done so since SHeDAISY's "Don't Worry 'Bout a Thing" in 2005, fourteen years prior. It reached a peak of #8 later that month. It also became the group's first chart single on the Billboard Hot 100, debuting at number 90 for the chart dated August 24, 2019.

It has sold 42,000 digital copies in the United States as of October 2019.

Charts

Weekly charts

Year-end charts

Certifications

References

2018 songs
2018 singles
Runaway June songs
Songs written by Josh Kear
Songs written by Hillary Lindsey
Song recordings produced by Dann Huff
BBR Music Group singles